Colonel Walter Liberty Vernon  (11 August 184617 January 1914) was an English architect who migrated to Australia and pursued his career as an architect in Sydney, New South Wales. In his role as the New South Wales Government Architect he is noted for designing multiple government buildings, many of which are extant with listings on national and state heritage registers.

Early life
Vernon was born 11 August 1846 in High Wycombe, Buckinghamshire, England, the son of a banker's clerk, Robert Vernon and Margaret Liberty. He was articled in 1862 to a London architect, W. G. Habershon, and studied at the Royal Academy of Arts and South Kensington School of Art. After completing his studies, he pursued a practice as an architect in London and married Margaret Anne Jones in 1870 at Newport, Wales. His London practice was successful, but he suffered from bronchial asthma and received medical advice to leave England. He migrated to Australia and arrived in Sydney in November 1883.

Career in Australia
Vernon established a private practice in Sydney, and then partnered with William Wardell from 1884 until 1889. Vernon assisted with works already in progress, designed buildings and supervised Wardell's Melbourne projects in 1884–85. Vernon was an alderman on East St Leonards Municipal Council in 1885–90, serving a single term as Mayor from 1887 to 1888. When the Borough of East St Leonards amalgamated to form the Municipality of North Sydney on 29 July 1890, Vernon was an Alderman of the new council, but did not seek re-election when his term expired in February 1891. Elected a fellow of the Royal Institute of British Architects in 1885, he joined the (Royal) Art Society of New South Wales in 1884, (Sir) John Sulman's Palladian Club and the Institute of Architects of New South Wales in 1887, and the Sydney Architectural Association in 1891.

On 1 August 1890 Vernon was appointed as the New South Wales Government Architect, however his staff numbers were reduced significantly. Vernon showed that the system of design competitions were twice as expensive and the activities of this office were boosted in 1894 when extra funding was committed as a way of creating relief work during the Depression of the 1890s.

As an architect practising in Australia, Vernon favoured what were later known as the Federation styles, such as the Free Classical, Arts and Crafts, and Free Style.

Examples of the former were his fire station in St Johns Road, Glebe, Jenolan Caves House in the Blue Mountains and the Public School, Military Road, Mosman. Examples of the latter were his fire stations in The Avenue, Randwick; Darlinghurst Road, Darlinghurst; and Pyrmont Street, Pyrmont. Another example of Federation Free Style is the former police station, Taylor Square, Darlinghurst. In a stylistic departure, he designed the (former) police station in Bourke Street, Surry Hills, in the Romanesque style.

For more substantial public buildings, Vernon continued the tradition whereby such buildings were designed in a Classical style. Notable examples were the Art Gallery of New South Wales, the Mitchell Library (part of the State Library), Central railway station and Newcastle Court House. The Art Gallery has been described as "masterly symmetry featuring Ionic colonnades." Central Station has been described as "the grandest railway station in Australia."

Vernon also designed significant additions to existing buildings, such as Customs House in Circular Quay; Randwick Police Station; the Chief Secretary's Building, Sydney; Balranald Post Office; Armidale Post Office; and the former Premier's Office, Sydney. His office was also responsible for the public decorations during the Federation celebrations of 1901.

in 1906, he advocated Mahkoolma, near the future site of Lake Burrinjuck, as the site of Australia's new national capital.

He retired as New South Wales Government Architect in 1911 and returned to private practice, establishing a partnership with Howard Joseland. The latter, also born in England, was a practitioner of the Federation Arts and Crafts and Federation Bungalow styles. One of the buildings designed by Vernon and Joseland was the Paterson Reid and Bruce building, York Street, Sydney. In 1911, Vernon judged the competition entries for Parliament House in Wellington, New Zealand, after the original buildings were destroyed in a 1907 fire.

Death and funeral
Following the amputation of a leg, Vernon died of septicaemia and gangrene on 17 January 1914 in Darlinghurst and his "impressive funeral" at St James' Church, Sydney on 19 January was attended by "a large and representative gathering of mourners". He is buried in the Anglican section of the Gore Hill cemetery.

Legacy
Vernon had an outstanding career as an architect, with many of his buildings being listed on various national and/or state heritage registers. He is known as a key practitioner of various Federation styles. The Vernon lectures in town planning, instituted at the University of Sydney in 1916, were endowed in his honour. Vernon Circle in Canberra is named in his honour, as is the Vernon Pavilion in Sydney's Centennial Park.

Partial list of works
The following buildings and structures were designed either in part or in full by Vernon, that are listed on active Commonwealth or State heritage registers include:

Other places were Vernon had involvement, either in part or in full, that are not listed on active Commonwealth or State heritage registers include the Anderson Stuart building, The University of Sydney, the former Balranald Post Office (since demolished), Bowral Court House, the former Braidwood Courthouse, Charles Sturt University, Original Farm and Farm School Buildings, Bathurst, Cootamundra Court House, Condobolin Court House, Cowra Court House, Crows Nest Fire Station, Darlinghurst Fire Station, Darlinghurst Police Station (former), Dubbo Lands Board Office, Forbes Lands Board Office, Hay Court House, Hay Lands Board Office, Hunters Hill Post Office, Kogarah Post Office (former), Lismore Post Office, Narrandera Court House, Newtown Post Office, Orange Lands Board Office, Parkes Court House, Pyrmont Fire Station, Randwick Police Station, Redfern Court House, Sargood & Co Warehouse (former), Surry Hills Police Station (former), Wagga Wagga Court House, Western Sydney University Stable Square, Richmond and Wyalong Court House.

Gallery

See also

 Federation architecture
 New South Wales Government Architect
Mahkoolma

References

External links

 Walter Liberty Vernon at Federation House

 

1846 births
1914 deaths
Architects from Buckinghamshire
New South Wales architects
Public servants of New South Wales
Federation architects
People from High Wycombe
19th-century Australian architects
Mayors of East St Leonards
Australian Army officers
19th-century Australian military personnel
Burials at Gore Hill Cemetery
North Sydney Council